300C may refer to:
 Chrysler 300 letter series, specifically the 1957 or 2005 "C" models of that line
 Schweizer (Hughes) 300C, a model of light helicopter
 Nissan 300C, the export version of the Nissan Cedric Y30